Alikhanly may refer to:
Alikhanly, Siazan, Azerbaijan
Alxanlı, Azerbaijan